Events in the year 2022 in North Macedonia.

Incumbents 
 President: Stevo Pendarovski
 Prime Minister: Dimitar Kovačevski

Events 
Ongoing — COVID-19 pandemic in North Macedonia

 24 June - Bulgaria lifts its veto against North Macedonia's bid to join the European Union.
 2 July - Protests erupt in the capital Skopje over the French proposal to unblock EU accession talks with North Macedonia.  
 16 July - The Assembly of North Macedonia passes a motion to amend North Macedonia’s Constitution to recognise its Bulgarian minority, while pledging to discuss remaining issues with the Bulgarian government. In exchange, Bulgaria will allow membership talks with the European Union to begin.
 19 July - Negotiations on the accession of North Macedonia and Albania to the European Union begin in Brussels.

Deaths 
 17 April – Omer Kaleshi, painter (b. 1932)
 1 August - Ilinka Mitreva, politician (b. 1950)
 10 August - Kiril Dojčinovski, footballer (b. 1943)

References 

 
North Macedonia
North Macedonia